Elisabeth of Wied (Pauline Elisabeth Ottilie Luise; 29 December 18432 March 1916) was the first queen of Romania as the wife of King Carol I from 15 March 1881 to 27 September 1914. She had been the princess consort of Romania since her marriage to then-Prince Carol on 15 November 1869.

Elisabeth was born into a German noble family. She was briefly considered as a potential bride for the future British king Edward VII, but Edward rejected her. Elisabeth married Prince Carol of Romania in 1869. Their only child, Princess Maria, died aged three in 1874, and Elisabeth never fully recovered from the loss of her daughter. When Romania became a kingdom in 1881, Elisabeth became queen, and she was crowned together with Carol that same year. 

Elisabeth was a prolific writer under the name Carmen Sylva.

Family and early life
Born at Castle Monrepos in Neuwied, she was the daughter of Hermann, Prince of Wied, and his wife Princess Marie of Nassau.

Elisabeth had artistic leanings; her childhood featured seances and visits to the local asylum for the mentally ill.

Marriage

When she was about 16, Elisabeth was considered as a possible bride for Albert Edward, Prince of Wales ("Bertie"), the eldest son and heir apparent of Queen Victoria of the United Kingdom. The Queen strongly favored Elisabeth as a prospective daughter-in-law and urged her daughter Victoria, Princess Royal, to look further into her. Elisabeth was spending the social season at the Berlin court, where her family hoped she would be tamed into a docile, marriageable princess. Princess Victoria told the Queen, "I do not think her at all distinguée looking—certainly the opposite to Bertie's usual taste", whereas the tall and slender Alexandra of Denmark was "just the style Bertie admires". The Prince of Wales was also shown photographs of Elisabeth, but professed himself unmoved and declined to give them a second glance. In the end, Alexandra was selected for Albert Edward.

Elisabeth first met Prince Karl of Hohenzollern-Sigmaringen in Berlin in 1861. In 1869, Karl, who was now Prince Carol of Romania, traveled to Germany in search of a suitable consort. He was reunited with Elisabeth, and the two were married on 15 November 1869 in Neuwied. Their only child, a daughter, Maria, died in 1874 at age three — an event from which Elisabeth never recovered. She was crowned Queen of Romania in 1881 after Romania was proclaimed a kingdom.

In the Russo-Turkish War of 1877–1878, also known as the Romanian War of Independence, she devoted herself to the care of the wounded, and founded the Decoration of the Cross of Queen Elisabeth to reward distinguished service in such work. She fostered the higher education of women in Romania, and established societies for various charitable objects. She was the 835th Dame of the Order of Queen Maria Luisa. She died at the Golescu Mansion in Bucharest.

She founded the National Society for the Blind and was the first royal patron of the Romanian Red Cross.

Early distinguished by her excellence as a pianist, organist and singer, she also showed considerable ability in painting and illuminating; but a lively poetic imagination led her to the path of literature, and more especially to poetry, folk-lore and ballads. In addition to numerous original works she put into literary form many of the legends current among the Romanian peasantry.

Literary activity

As "Carmen Sylva", she wrote with facility in German, Romanian, French and English. A few of her voluminous writings, which include poems, plays, novels, short stories, essays, collections of aphorisms, etc., may be singled out for special mention:
Her earliest publications were "Sappho" and "Hammerstein", two poems which appeared at Leipzig in 1880.
Cuvinte Sufletesci, religious meditations in Romanian (Bucharest, 1888), was also translated into German (Bonn, 1890), under the name of Seelen-Gespräche.

Several of the works of "Carmen Sylva" were written in collaboration with Mite Kremnitz, one of her maids of honor; these were published between 1881 and 1888, in some cases under the pseudonyms Dito et Idem. These include:
 Aus zwei Welten (Leipzig, 1884), a novel
 Anna Boleyn (Bonn, 1886), a tragedy
 In der Irre (Bonn, 1888), a collection of short stories
 Edleen Vaughan, or Paths of Peril (London, 1894), a novel
 Sweet Hours (London, 1904), poems, written in English.

Among the translations made by "Carmen Sylva" include:
 German versions of Pierre Loti's romance Pecheur d'Islande
 German versions of Paul de St Victor's dramatic criticisms Les Deux Masques (Paris, 1881–1884)
 and especially The Bard of the Dimbovitza, an English translation of Elena Văcărescu's collection of Romanian folk-songs, etc., entitled Lieder aus dem Dimbovitzathal (Bonn, 1889), translated by "Carmen Sylva" and Alma Strettell.

The Bard of the Dimbovitza was first published in 1891, and was soon reissued and expanded. Translations from the original works of "Carmen Sylva" have appeared in all the principal languages of Europe and in Armenian.

A book of reminiscences From Memory's Shrine was published in 1911.

Văcărescu Affair
In 1881, due to the lack of heirs to the Romanian throne, King Carol I adopted his nephew, Ferdinand. Ferdinand, a complete stranger in his new home, started to get close to one of Elisabeth's ladies in waiting, Elena Văcărescu. Elisabeth, very close to Elena herself, encouraged the romance, although she was perfectly aware of the fact that a marriage between the two was forbidden by the Romanian constitution.

The result of this was the exile of both Elisabeth (in Neuwied) and Elena (in Paris), as well as a trip by Ferdinand through Europe in search of a suitable bride, whom he eventually found in Queen Victoria's granddaughter, Princess Marie of Edinburgh. The affair helped reinforce Elisabeth's image as a dreamer and eccentric.

Quite unusually for a queen, Elisabeth of Wied was personally of the opinion that a republican form of government was preferable to monarchy—an opinion which she expressed forthrightly in her diary, though she did not make it public at the time:I must sympathize with the Social Democrats, especially in view of the inaction and corruption of the nobles. These "little people", after all, want only what nature confers: equality. The Republican form of government is the only rational one. I can never understand the foolish people, the fact that they continue to tolerate us.

Honours

National
 : Dame of the Order of Louise
  Hohenzollern: Dame of the House Order of Hohenzollern
 : Knight Grand Cross of the Order of the Crown
 : Knight Grand Cross with Collar of the Order of Carol I
 : Knight Grand Cross of the Order of the Star of Romania
 : Grand Master Knight of the Decoration of the Cross of Queen Elisabeth
 : Recipient of the Ruby Jubilee Medal of King Carol I

Foreign
 :
 Dame of the Order of the Starry Cross, 1st Class
 Decoration of Honour for Arts and Sciences, in Brilliants, 1896
 Grand Cross of the Imperial Austrian Order of Elizabeth, 1913
 : Dame of the Order of Queen Saint Isabel
 : Grand Cross of the Imperial Order of Saint Catherine
 : Grand Cross of the Royal Order of Saint Sava
 : Dame of the Order of Queen Maria Luisa, 26 December 1884
 : Royal Order of Victoria and Albert, 1st Class
 : Dame of the Order of Olga, 1880

Legacy
The Bucharest-born colonizer of Patagonia and Tierra del Fuego, Julius Popper, was a fan of her work and named some features after her.
 Sierra Carmen Silva (Chile)
 Río Carmen Silva (Argentina, also known as Río Chico)
 The Forest path of Carmen Sylva (Šetalište Carmen Sylve) in Opatija, Croatia
Villa Carmen Sylva (Domburg)
Villa Carmen Sylva (Varese)

Ancestry

References

Bibliography
 Eugen Wolbe, "Carmen Sylva", Leipzig, 1933
 Gabriel Badea-Päun, Carmen Sylva - Uimitoarea Regină Elisabeta a României, 1843–1916, Bucharest, Humanitas, 2003, second edition in 2007, third edition in 2008; 
 Gabriel Badea-Päun, Jean-Jules-Antoine Lecomte du Nouÿ (1842–1923) à la cour royale de Roumanie, dans Bulletin de la Société de l'Historie de l'Art Français, Année 2005, Paris, 2006, pp. 257–81. 

 Zimmermann, Silvia Irina: The Child of the Sun: Royal Fairy Tales and Essays by the Queens of Romania, Elisabeth (Carmen Sylva, 1843-1916) and Marie (1875-1938). Selected and edited, with an introduction and bibliography by Silvia Irina Zimmermann. Stuttgart: ibidem-Verlag (Ibidem Press), 2020, 315 pages, 54 illustrations (7 colored), .
 Zimmermann, Silvia Irina: Der Zauber des fernen Königreichs. Carmen Sylvas „Pelesch-Märchen“, (Magisterarbeit Universität Marburg 1996), ibidem-Verlag, Stuttgart, 2011, 180 pages; .
 Zimmermann, Silvia Irina: Die dichtende Königin. Elisabeth, Prinzessin zu Wied, Königin von Rumänien, Carmen Sylva (1843–1916). Selbstmythisierung und prodynastische Öffentlichkeitsarbeit durch Literatur, (Doctoral thesis University of Marburg 2001/2003), ibidem-Verlag, Stuttgart, 2010, 482 pages; .

External links 

 Research Center Carmen Sylva of the Princely Archive of Wied 
 Carmen Sylva – Regina Elisabeta of Romania at Tom's Place (tkinter.org) – works by and about her, gallery from newspapers and magazines 
 
 
 Books about Carmen Sylva and new editions of her works 

 
 

1843 births
1916 deaths
People from Neuwied
People from the Duchy of Nassau
House of Wied-Neuwied
Princesses of Hohenzollern-Sigmaringen
Romanian Lutherans
Romanian dramatists and playwrights
Romanian folklorists
Women folklorists
19th-century Romanian novelists
19th-century Romanian poets
Romanian royal consorts
Romanian women short story writers
Romanian short story writers
Romanian translators
Romanian writers in French
Romanian writers in German
Romanian writers
German women writers
German writers in French
20th-century German writers
Romanian women novelists
Romanian women poets
Women dramatists and playwrights
20th-century Romanian novelists
20th-century Romanian poets
20th-century Romanian women writers
Honorary members of the Romanian Academy
Honorary members of the Saint Petersburg Academy of Sciences
Dames of the Order of Saint Isabel
Ladies of the Royal Order of Victoria and Albert
Grand Crosses of the Order of the Crown (Romania)
Burials at Curtea de Argeş Cathedral
Female wartime nurses